The EMC EA/EB is an early passenger train-hauling diesel locomotive built from May 16, 1937, to 1938 by Electro-Motive Corporation of La Grange, Illinois for the Baltimore and Ohio Railroad. They were the first model in a long line of passenger diesels of similar design known as EMD E-units. Each locomotive unit developed  from two  Winton 201-A diesel engines, driving the wheels through an electric transmission—the generator driven by each engine provided current for traction motors. The locomotives were of A1A-A1A wheel arrangement—two three-axle trucks of which only the outer two axles were powered. Six two-unit  locomotives were produced, each consisting of a lead cab-equipped EA A unit and a cabless booster EB B unit. They were numbered 51 through 56; the A units bore the bare number and the B units the number followed by 'X'.

Trains hauled 
The six locomotives hauled some of the major named trains of the B&O; the Royal Blue, the Capitol Limited, the National Limited, and others. These trains were streamliners in appearance, but they were built largely of refurbished heavyweight passenger cars rebuilt with smooth sides, smooth rooflines, air conditioning, new interiors and modern appointments.

B&O 52 was sold to the Alton Railroad in 1940. This locomotive became a Gulf, Mobile and Ohio Railroad unit in 1947.

Significance and influence 
The EA/EB—along with the more-or-less simultaneous E1 for the Atchison, Topeka and Santa Fe Railway and the E2 for the Union Pacific Railroad, Chicago and North Western Railway and Southern Pacific Railroad—represented an important step in the evolution of the passenger diesel locomotive. While the EA, E1 and E2 were each built for a specific railroad, they were largely identical mechanically and were a step further away from the custom-built, integrated streamliner and towards mass-produced passenger locomotives—a step achieved with the E3 and E6, EMD's later models.

Styling 
The EA/EB and E1 featured largely identical and innovative styling showing the influence of the Electro-Motive Corporation's new buyer General Motors. While mechanically they had much in common with previous, experimental EMC locomotives, GM understood the importance of looking new and exciting, not merely being technically innovative. This basic "slant nose" style was continued in the subsequent E3, E4, E5 and E6 models, while a more "bulldog nose" style was tried in the E2 and a style somewhere in between was used for the E7, E8 and E9, as well as the freight diesel cab units. 

Its initial design was protected under US Patent D106,918.

Preservation 
B&O #51, the first EA built, has been preserved at the Baltimore and Ohio Railroad Museum in Baltimore, Maryland. The EA has completed cosmetic restoration and is now on exhibit.

References

Notes

Bibliography

 
 
 
 
 
 
 
 
 
 

A1A-A1A locomotives
E0
Baltimore and Ohio locomotives
Passenger locomotives
Diesel-electric locomotives of the United States
Railway locomotives introduced in 1937
Locomotives with cabless variants
Standard gauge locomotives of the United States
Streamlined diesel locomotives